"Lisa vs. Malibu Stacy" is the fourteenth episode of the fifth season of the American animated television series The Simpsons, and the 95th episode overall. It originally aired on the Fox network in the United States on February 17, 1994. Lisa challenges the Malibu Stacy dollmakers to make a less sexist doll. With Malibu Stacy's original creator, Stacy Lovell, Lisa creates the doll Lisa Lionheart to positively influence young girls.

The episode was written by Bill Oakley and Josh Weinstein, and directed by Jeffrey Lynch. Its plot was inspired by the Teen Talk Barbie doll, which "spoke" short phrases stereotypical of a middle-class American teenager. Kathleen Turner guest stars as Lovell. It features cultural references to action figures such as Ken and G.I. Joe.

The episode has received mostly positive critical reviews. It acquired a Nielsen rating of 11.6, and was the second-highest-rated show on the Fox network the week it aired.

Plot
Dr. Hibbert introduces a frail Ben Matlock to a crowd of excited seniors at the grand opening of a geriatric medical center. After seeing Matlock mobbed to the ground by fans, Grampa becomes aware of his mortality and gives the family their inheritance early. He leaves them a box of old Liberty head silver dollars which they decide to spend right away.

During the entire trip to the mall and back home, Grampa tells far-fetched stories and spouts useless advice, making the family shun him. At the mall, Lisa eagerly buys the new talking Malibu Stacy doll, but is disappointed when the doll utters sexist phrases such as "Thinking too much gives you wrinkles" and "Don't ask me, I'm just a girl." After Lisa and Grampa bemoan how they are treated because of their age, they decide to change: Grampa will get a job and Lisa will find Malibu Stacy's creator, Stacy Lovell.

Grampa struggles with his new job at Krusty Burger, suffering a war flashback at the drive-thru and losing his false teeth when a coworker accidentally wraps up a bun that he put them in as a prank and sent out as part of an order. He soon becomes angry at the way seniors are treated and quits.

Lisa visits Waylon Smithers, owner of the world's largest Malibu Stacy collection. She asks his help in finding Lovell, who was ousted from the Malibu Stacy company in 1974 (due to her ideas not being considered cost-effective — and for funneling profits to the Viet Cong). Lisa and Lovell decide to create a new talking doll, Lisa Lionheart, voiced by Lisa herself. The doll, designed to look more realistic than Malibu Stacy and costing $46,000 to mass-produce and market, says inspirational and encouraging phrases for girls. However, the Malibu Stacy executives learn of its development and worry that Lisa's doll poses a real threat to their sales.

After a slow initial release, Lisa Lionheart suddenly gains popularity among Malibu Stacy fans after being featured in Kent Brockman's news show at the behest of his daughter. As kids and Smithers rush to the mall to buy Lisa Lionheart, a cart of Malibu Stacy dolls with new hats is wheeled into their path. Though Lisa protests at the cheap reissues of Malibu Stacy dolls, the kids and Smithers ransack the cart regardless. However, one little girl selects a Lisa Lionheart doll, which gives Lisa hope for her brand.

Production

The episode was written by Bill Oakley and Josh Weinstein, and directed by Jeffrey Lynch. Before the episode aired, Malibu Stacy had already appeared many times on the show as one of Lisa's dolls. The staff were trying to come up with an idea for an episode by going through the companies in the Simpsons universe, and Oakley suggested an episode involving the Malibu Stacy company. The plot of the episode was inspired by the Teen Talk Barbie talking doll that caused controversy in the United States in the early 1990s. In July 1992, Mattel released Teen Talk Barbie, which spoke a number of phrases including "Will we ever have enough clothes?", "I love shopping!", and "Wanna have a pizza party?" Each doll was programmed to say four out of 270 possible phrases, so that there were over 200 million combinations. One of these 270 phrases was "Math class is tough!". Although only about 1.5% of all the dolls sold said the phrase, it led to criticism from the American Association of University Women because they regarded it as demeaning to women. In October 1992, Mattel announced that Teen Talk Barbie would no longer say the phrase, and offered a swap to anyone who owned a doll that did.

Oakley and Weinstein decided to include Abe in the episode because they had an "obsession" with old people. Weinstein said they both "love them and seem to really hate them" at the same time. He also said that they enjoy writing for characters such as Abe and Mr. Burns because of their "out-datedness", and because he and Oakley get to use dictionaries for looking up "old time slang". Executive producer David Mirkin thought it was difficult to make Abe funny because he is a "boring and tedious" character. He thinks that even though "Abe's doing all these complaints, what makes him funny is that the things he says are actually funny in the context of the boring and tedium." Mirkin thought this was a "big challenge, and Bill and Josh pulled it off very well."

When the episode was in production, Oakley's wife Rachel Pulido was an enthusiastic Barbie collector. Oakley therefore spent a lot of time going to Barbie conventions across the United States and met many different collectors. At one convention, Oakley met the man who owned the world's largest Barbie collection. The meeting between the two inspired the part of the episode where Lisa visits Smithers and it is revealed that Smithers is the owner of the world's largest Malibu Stacy collection. Kathleen Turner guest starred in the episode as Stacy Lovell. Mirkin thought Turner was "completely game" when she showed up at the recording studio to record her lines as she "nailed" her lines really fast. He added that he enjoyed directing her and he thought she had one of the best performances ever on The Simpsons.

Cultural references
 At the beginning of the episode, Abe watches his idol Ben Matlock talk to a crowd of excited seniors at the Grand Opening of the Center for Geriatric Medicine. Ben Matlock is a character from the NBC/ABC television series Matlock, portrayed by Andy Griffith and created by Dean Hargrove. The crowd cheer for Matlock by singing a slightly changed version of the "We Love You, Conrad" song from stage musical Bye Bye Birdie. Homer dances on giant piano keys recessed in the floor of the toy store, spoofing a scene from the 1988 film Big. Lisa wants Lisa Lionheart to have "the wisdom of Gertrude Stein, the wit of Cathy Guisewite, the tenacity of Nina Totenberg, the common sense of Elizabeth Cady Stanton, and the down-to-earth good looks of Eleanor Roosevelt."

Stacy Lovell's list of husbands features the action figures Ken, Johnny West, G.I. Joe, Doctor Colossus, and Steve Austin. Lisa's story about the Malibu Stacy doll saying phrases that are considered demeaning to women is based on the Teen Talk Barbie line of dolls and how they caused controversy. During one scene in the episode, one girl's Malibu Stacy doll says "My Spidey Sense is tingling! Anyone call for a web-slinger?", a reference to a practical joke by the Barbie Liberation Organization in the early 1990s in which the voiceboxes of talking Barbie and G.I. Joe toys were swapped.

Reception

Critical reception
Since airing, the episode has received mostly positive reviews from television critics. DVD Movie Guide's Colin Jacobson thought the episode was "good but not great", despite "more than a few strong moments, like the hilarious shot of Bart at the gay rights parade." He added that "most years this would be an A-list program, but it’s one of season five’s lesser lights despite a generally high level of quality." The authors of the book I Can't Believe It's a Bigger and Better Updated Unofficial Simpsons Guide, Warren Martyn and Adrian Wood, described the episode as "Lisa at her crusading best, Homer at his stupidest and Abe getting all the best lines again, especially at Krusty Burgers. Kathleen Turner's spot as the real Malibu Stacy is superb."

Janica Lockhart of The Easterner called the episode a "classic" and added: "The episode takes on misogynist views, but in a humorous way, that only The Simpsons can master." Patrick Bromley of DVD Verdict gave the episode a grade of A. DVD Talk's Bill Gibron gave it a score of 5 out of 5.

The episode is one of Oakley and Weinstein's favorites from their time as writers on the show. When The Simpsons began streaming on Disney+ in 2019, Oakley named this one of the best classic Simpsons episodes to watch on the service. One of Mirkin's favorite jokes on the show is the scene in this episode where Abe cycles down the street, shouting "Look at me, I'm acting young!" before Lisa's Malibu Stacy doll catches the front wheel of the bike, sending Abe flying into an open grave.

In the book The Simpsons and Philosophy: The D'oh! of Homer, Aeon J. Skoble cited the episode as an example in his piece titled: "Do We Admire or Laugh at Lisa?". He wrote: "The fact that the less intellectual doll is vastly preferred over Lisa's doll, even though Lisa's objections are reasonable, demonstrates the ways in which reasonable ideas can be made to take a back seat to having fun and going with the flow. This debate is often played out in the real world, of course: Barbie is the subject of perennial criticism along the lines of Lisa's
critique of Malibu Stacy, yet remains immensely popular, and in general, we often see
intellectual critiques of toys dismissed as 'out of touch' or elitist."

Ratings
In its original broadcast, "Lisa vs. Malibu Stacy" finished 23rd in the ratings for the week of February 14–20, 1994, with a Nielsen rating of 11.6, equivalent to 11 million viewing households. It was the second highest-rated show on the Fox network that week, following Beverly Hills, 90210.

References

Further reading

External links

 

The Simpsons (season 5) episodes
Barbie
1994 American television episodes
Television episodes about sexism